Tomorrow at Dawn is a 2009 French drama film directed by Denis Dercourt. It competed in the Un Certain Regard section at the 2009 Cannes Film Festival.

Cast
 Vincent Perez as Mathieu
 Jérémie Renier as Paul
 Aurélien Recoing as Capitaine Déprées 
 Anne Marivin as Jeanne
 Françoise Lebrun as Claire Guibert  
 Gérald Laroche as Major Rogart
 Barbara Probst as Christelle
 Béatrice Agenin as The Duchess

References

External links

2009 films
2009 drama films
French drama films
Films about duels
Films directed by Denis Dercourt
2000s French films